Zeb Montague Kyffin (born 23 February 1998) is a British cyclist who currently rides for UCI Continental team .

Career 
In 2017 Kyffin finished in the top ten during the 2017 British National Hill Climb Championships.

In 2018 Kyffin joined the British road racing team , finishing twelfth in the under-23 element of the British National Road Race Championships.

In 2019 he participated in the Tour de Yorkshire, the British National Road Race Championships, and the British National Time Trial Championships; he also competed in the Saudi Tour in 2020.

In 2021 after the gradual alleviation of COVID-19 restrictions in the United Kingdom, Kyffin won the Chitterne Road Race - thus, becoming the first UCI continental rider to win a British national road race since 2019.

Personal life 
Kyffin lived in Eindhoven, the Netherlands, until he was twelve years old. He then moved to Newcastle upon Tyne and was educated at Newcastle School for Boys. He studied industrial design at Northumbria University.

Major results

Road

References

External links

British male cyclists
1998 births
Living people
21st-century British people